"So Small" is a song co-written and recorded by American country music artist Carrie Underwood. It was released in August 2007 as the first single from her 2007 album Carnival Ride. Underwood co-wrote this song with Hillary Lindsey and Luke Laird.

Background
"So Small" is the first single for which Underwood shares a writing credit. Underwood co-wrote the song "I Ain't In Checotah Anymore" but it was not released as a single from her debut album, Some Hearts.

Underwood's quote on So Small:

Single release
"So Small" was officially released to country radio stations on July 31, 2007.

The single was digitally released on Napster on August 14, 2007, the same day it was made available for sale on the Canadian iTunes Store, but was removed after several days. The song was permanently available for download on Napster and released on the U.S. iTunes Store on August 28, 2007.

She debuted this song at the 2007 Country Music Association Awards.

Music video 
Underwood's video for "So Small" was directed by Roman White. The video was originally planned to be premiering on September 13 on CMT, but instead premiered on September 20, 2007 on CMT, where the channel became "Carrie Music Television" and aired the video continuously from 6:00am–12:00pm straight, playing it an estimated 66 times. The video was also made available to purchase exclusively on the iTunes music store on September 20.

The video begins with a teenager girl walking down a country road alone at dusk, carrying only a backpack. A flashback is shown of her arguing with her mother before she walks out of her house. Two cars are then shown approaching her from opposite ends, driven by a man (played by Christian Kane) and a crying woman. As the woman's car nears the teenager, she steps in front of it in an attempt to commit suicide. The woman swerves to the left side of the road to avoid hitting her, colliding instead with the man's car. Both vehicles freeze in mid-collision with their occupants unharmed and unaffected by the collision, while the front of the vehicles crumple from the impact and the windshields shatter, sending glass flying everywhere. Both the man and the woman have flashbacks of themselves leaving home after having a fight with their respective families and leaving them. As the night fades with a sunrise, the collision is reversed, and the teenager steps back from the road instead of onto it. Seeing this, both the man and the woman stop their cars and step out. The video ends with the three of them returning to their homes and reconciling with their families.

Underwood is also seen throughout the video standing in the middle of the road in separate shots, singing both at night and in the morning.

Chart performance
"So Small" debuted at number 20 on the Billboard Hot Country Songs on August 18, 2007, making the highest chart entry by a solo country female artist in 43 years of Nielsen BDS history. The record would later be surpassed by Taylor Swift's 2012 single "We Are Never Ever Getting Back Together." The song subsequently debuted at number 13 on the Billboard Bubbling Under Hot 100 Singles on the same day. 
It made its debut entry in the Hot 100 at 98 two weeks later. It jumped 76 positions on the Hot 100 in its third week on the chart, from 93 to 17, with 71,000 digital downloads, becoming Underwood's fifth top 20 hit on the chart. As of May 2012, the single has been certified Platinum. It has sold 1,088,000 copies as of November 2015.

The song also became Underwood's fourth number one single on the Billboard country music charts, holding the peak position for three weeks, and her fifth consecutive number one country single overall.

Year-end charts

Release history

Cover versions
 American Idol 2009 finalist Matt Giraud performed this song during Grand Ole Opry week.
 German band ItaloBrothers covered the song on their 2010 album Stamp!
 Ty Herndon released a version of this song on his 2019 album, "Got It Covered."

Awards and nominations

2010 CMA Triple-Play Awards

|-
| align="center"|2010 ||align="center"| "So Small" ||align="center"| Triple-Play Songwriter (along with "All-American Girl" and "Last Name") ||

2008 CMT Music Awards

|-
| align="center"|2008 ||align="center"| "So Small" ||align="center"| Female Video of the Year ||

14th Inspirational Country Music Awards

|-
| align="center"|2008 ||align="center"| "So Small" ||align="center"| Inspirational Country Music Video of the Year ||

2008 BMI Awards

|-
| align="center"|2008 ||align="center"| "So Small" ||align="center"| Songwriter of the Year (Carrie Underwood) ||

References

External links
"So Small" video at CMT.com

2000s ballads
2007 songs
Carrie Underwood songs
2007 singles
Pop ballads
Country ballads
Songs written by Luke Laird
Songs written by Hillary Lindsey
Songs written by Carrie Underwood
Song recordings produced by Mark Bright (record producer)
Music videos directed by Roman White
Arista Nashville singles